Seleucus may refer to:

Monarchs and other people related to the Seleucid Empire
 Seleucus I Nicator (Satrap 311–305 BC, King 305 BC–281 BC), son of Antiochus and founder of the Seleucid Empire
 Seleucus II Callinicus (246–225 BC)
 Seleucus III Ceraunus (or Soter) (225–223 BC)
 Seleucus IV Philopator (187–175 BC)
 Seleucus V Philometor (126/125 BC)
 Seleucus VI Epiphanes Nicator (96–95 BC)
 Seleucus VII Kybiosaktes or Philometor (70s BC–60s BC?)
 Seleucus, probable name of the father of Antiochus (father of Seleucus I Nicator)
 Seleucus, a son of Antiochus I Soter and grandson to Seleucus I 
 Seleucus, one of the sons of Antiochus VII Sidetes and Cleopatra Thea
 Seleucus (commandant), in 30 BC commandant of the eastern Egyptian border-fortress Pelusium

Other people
 Seleucus, son of Bithys, Ptolemaic governor of Cyprus (c.145-130 BC),
 Seleucus of Alexandria, a grammarian and sophist,
 Seleucus of Seleucia, an astronomer,
 Seleucus (son of Ablabius), a rhetorician and friend of Julian the Apostate,
 Seleucus (Theodosian Praetorian prefect), Praetorian prefect of the Theodosian dynasty,
 Seleucus (Roman usurper), a Roman usurper.

Other uses
Seleucus (crater), a crater on Earth's moon
3288 Seleucus, an asteroid

See also
 Seleucia (disambiguation)
 Seleucid Empire